Francisco de Paula León Olea (born 1951) is a musician, author, and businessman from Mexico City, Mexico. He is also notable for his political involvement in the Mexican transition to democracy.

Early life and education
Francisco de Paula León Olea was born in Mexico City, Mexico in 1951 to Gabriel León and Martha Olea. One of his grandfathers was Teofilo Olea y Leyva, one of The Seven Sages of Mexico.

He studied sacred music at the seminary of the Holy Catholic Fathers, then studied piano and piano composition at the Escuela Nacional de Música of the Universidad Nacional Autónoma de México. He has a master's degree in International Relations from American University, where he is on the board of trustees.

Music career
He studied at Conservatorio Nacional de Música and in 1989, he became the first Mexican composer of Symphonic Requiem, which was inaugurated in 1990 by Symphony Orchestra of the Universidad Autónoma de México. In 1994, he composed the Fantasy of the Universe, which was performed by the International Music Festival of Morelia México. He left his music career after the death of his father.

Politics
In 2000, de Paula León Olea started the Citizen's Parliament and Republican Action Movement to support the democratic transition of Mexico. In 2002, the Republican Action Movement applied to create the Republican party headed by de Paula León Olea, who was the president of the organization.

De Paula León Olea also founded an editorial company responsible for publishing the magazine Conciencia Mexicana. During Mexico's political transition, the magazine published interviewed political leaders Kofi Annan, Hillary Clinton, and Václav Havel.  In 1999, the magazine interviewed ex-President Carlos Salinas, who was in exile in Dublin at the time.

During this time period, De Paula León Olea wrote and published political articles in both Conciencia Mexicana and Mexican newspapers in which he criticized the corruption of the Mexican elite, claimed the right to more than one political party, and asked for peaceful change.

World Trade Center and Lawsuit
In the late 1980s, Alfredo Ruiz Suárez and Francisco de Paula León redesigned the building that was going to be the Hotel de Mexico and proposed to turn it into an international business center instead. The World Trade Center Mexico City opened in November 1994.

In 1999, De Paula León Olea filed a multimillion-dollar lawsuit in Washington D.C. against the Mexican government and the governor of the central bank, accusing them of fraud and illegal association. The lawsuit alleged that in 1991, the president of the Central Bank of Mexico (then a deputy secretary of the Treasury) made threats to force the sale of a portion of shares of the World Trade Center in Mexico City. De Paula León Olea headed the World Trade Center project and claimed that the government and Central Bank diverted the funds and he did not receive his portion of sales from shares. In the lawsuit, he denounced the government for the sale of the World Trade Center Building and denounced the bailout of Fobaproa. There was an investigation into irregular dealings with the Banking Savings Protection Fund and the National Bank of Foreign Trade.

The Giordano Bruno University
De Paula León Olea is the President and Chairman of the Board of Giordano Bruno University. He worked with Ervin Laszlo to launch this online university in Budapest in 2012.

Books
In addition to writing about politics, De Paula León Olea writes about philosophy and fiction. His published books include Ianoa Coeli: A Ship of Hope in the Mexican Mad Years and Los hilos secretos de las élites,. His book, The Awakening of Mankind: Towards a Unified Theory of Man in the 21st Century, summarizes his philosophy of non-subordination. His first historical-fiction novel, The Color of Heaven and Earth, was published in 2012. Other fiction includes La Barcaza en el Sena and a collection of short stories called Cuentos de la vida Real.

Awards
In April 2013 he received the Life Time Achievement Award in the Arts and Humanities given by the Mexic-Arte Museum in Austin, Texas.

References

1951 births
Living people
Mexican musicians
Mexican male writers
Businesspeople from Mexico City
Musicians from Mexico City
Writers from Mexico City